"Ay!" (stylized in all lowercase) is a song by American rappers Machine Gun Kelly and Lil Wayne. It was released on March 4, 2022 as the third single from the former's sixth studio album Mainstream Sellout (2022). The song was produced by Travis Barker, BazeXX, and SlimXX.

Background
In February 2022, Machine Gun Kelly performed a snippet of the song at The Late Late Show with James Corden, in a medley of "Ay!", then-unreleased track "Maybe" and "Emo Girl". The song has been considered to a return to the hip hop genre for Machine Gun Kelly, although it comes from an album that is still largely to the pop punk genre.

Composition
"Ay!" is an emo rap song that blends elements of pop punk and trap, featuring "brooding but dreamy guitar loop with crisp hip-hop production". Machine Gun Kelly sings about sadness affecting his life, including "his preference for sad playlists, skipping meetings, and sleeping until 7 p.m."; he mentions cutting his hair and compares it to Britney Spears shaving her hair off in 2007 during her breakdown. Lil Wayne's verse has a reference to the band Guns N' Roses.

Reception
AllMusic said "the watery emo-trap track "Ay!" doesn't commit fully enough to any of its stylistic directions, giving Lil Wayne little to work with as he turns in a distracted, Auto-Tune-doused verse." In a review of Mainstream Sellout, BrooklynVegan called the song, along with "Drug Dealer", "among its most forgettable" tracks.

Music video
The music video was released alongside the single. It was filmed in Machine Gun Kelly's home from an iPhone, on the night before it was released. It finds Kelly and four friends in a dressing room changing into different flashy outfits. Lil Wayne does not physically appear, but a paper cutout of a drawn Wayne performs in the video.

Charts

Weekly charts

Year-end charts

Certifications

References

2022 singles
2022 songs
Machine Gun Kelly (musician) songs
Lil Wayne songs
Bad Boy Records singles
Interscope Records singles
Song recordings produced by Travis Barker
Songs written by Machine Gun Kelly (musician)
Songs written by Travis Barker
Songs written by Gregory Hein
Emo rap songs
Trap music songs